Sando may refer to:

Places
Sando, Salamanca, a municipality in Spain
Sandø (disambiguation), several municipalities in Norway
Sandö Bridge , northern Sweden
San Fernando, Trinidad and Tobago, also known as Sando

People
Sando (official) (1876–1941), Qing dynasty and Republic of China official who was the last Qing viceroy of Mongolia
Frank Sando (1931–2012), British long-distance runner

Other uses
Sandō, the road leading to a Shinto shrine
 Sando (TV series), a 2018 Australian comedy television series
a term for sandwich

See also
Santa María de Sando, a municipality in Spain
Yardu Sando, a village in Sierra Leone